Tirupati Airport  is a domestic airport serving Tirupati, Andhra Pradesh. It is situated in Renigunta, a suburb of Tirupati.

History

The airport was commissioned in 1971. The upgraded airport was opened for passenger traffic in 1999 by the then Prime Minister of India, Atal Bihari Vajpayee.

The airport was declared an international airport by the Government of India in June 2017. In order to meet the demands of the anticipated international traffic and international chartered flights, AAI took up expansion of the airport to make it suitable for Code-E type of aircraft. The then Vice President of India, Venkaiah Naidu, laid the foundation stone for the project on 20 February 2019. Upgrading the airport to Code E would also enable the airport to serve as a diversion airport for the two neighbouring metropolitan international airports of Bengaluru and Chennai, in case of emergencies. A new apron to accommodate wide-bodied aircraft is built and operational.

Facilities

Terminal
It can handle 500 domestic and 200 international passengers at a time. The foundation stone was laid in October 2010 by Manmohan Singh, then Prime Minister of India.
Construction began in 2012, and the terminal was inaugurated on 22 October 2015 by Prime Minister Narendra Modi.
The new terminal has 18 check-in-counters, four immigration counters, four baggage conveyors for arrival and one for departure, three baggage claim carousels, two VIP lounges, and parking area for 250 cars.

Runway

Airlines and destinations

Statistics

Incidents 
On 15 November 1993, Indian Airlines Flight 440 (IC-440), an Airbus 300B2 (registered VT-EDV), operating on a scheduled flight from Madras (now Chennai) to Hyderabad, crashed into the paddy fields near Tirupati Airport. It had been diverted due to poor weather and ran out of fuel. There were no major injuries, but the aircraft was damaged beyond repair.

On 29 January 2019, Air India flight AI 541 from Tirupati to New Delhi via Hyderabad suffered damages after "foreign objects" from the runway hit the underside and wings of the flight during take-off. While the underside just suffered scratches, the wings suffered heavy damage. However, the flight safely landed in Hyderabad and there were no casualties.

Notes 
The airport requires planes to fly no more than an altitude of 853 m (2,799 ft) because the Venkateswara Temple which is located on the nearby hill of Tirumala, is considered sacred. The temple's Agama Shastras say that no flying object can fly higher than the height of the temple.

See also 
 List of airports in Andhra Pradesh

References

External links

Airports in Andhra Pradesh
Airports established in 2015
Buildings and structures in Tirupati
2015 establishments in Andhra Pradesh
Transport in Tirupati
International airports in India